Florent Ghisolfi (born 28 February 1985) is a French former professional footballer who played as a midfielder for SC Bastia and Stade de Reims.

Career
After he retired from playing football, Ghisolfi went into club management. He became the sporting director for Ligue 1 side RC Lens in 2019.

References

External links

1985 births
Living people
French people of Italian descent
People from Aubagne
Sportspeople from Bouches-du-Rhône
Association football midfielders
French footballers
Ligue 1 players
Ligue 2 players
SC Bastia players
Stade de Reims players
Footballers from Provence-Alpes-Côte d'Azur